David "Dai" Richards (born 23 May 1954) is a former Welsh international rugby union player. In 1980 he toured South Africa with the British Lions and at the time played club rugby for Swansea.

Rugby career
He was brought into the Welsh side in 1979 for the Five Nations game against France in Paris in place of Llanelli's Ray Gravell.  
In hindsight, many observers believe it would have been better to have retained the Steve Fenwick/Ray Gravell centre partnership and moved David Richards to fly-half instead of Cardiff's Gareth Davies.  Richards played fly-half for his club side Swansea and was much more effective in that position and indeed his greatest Welsh performance was against Scotland in 1980 when he moved from centre to fly-half when Davies was injured.  he played a fine game and scored a magnificent try. He played 305 games for Swansea between 1972/73 and 1985/86, scoring 111 tries, and captained the club in 1981/82, 1982/83 and 1983/84. He toured with the 1980 British Lions to South Africa, playing seven games, including one international appearance. He was also a reserve for the 1977 British Lions tour to New Zealand. He was Welsh Rugby player of the year in 1980.

As well as representing the full Wales team, he also played for Wales B and was also picked for invitational touring side, the Barbarians. After his playing career he became a National selector for the Welsh Rugby Union.

Notes

1954 births
Living people
Barbarian F.C. players
British & Irish Lions rugby union players from Wales
Glynneath RFC players
People educated at Neath Grammar School for Boys
Rugby union players from Neath Port Talbot
Swansea RFC players
Wales international rugby union players
Welsh rugby union players
Rugby union centres